The National University of Rwanda (NUR; , , UNR) was the largest university in Rwanda. Its founder and first rector was Father Georges-Henri Lévesque.

When it was established, the NUR had three divisions (Faculties of Medicine and Social Sciences, and a Teacher Training College), 51 students and 16 lecturers. The university suffered badly during the genocide and had to close in 1994, reopening in April 1995. At that time English was introduced as a medium of instruction alongside French.

In 2013, along with all public higher education institutions in Rwanda, it was merged into the newly created University of Rwanda.

History
When it started in 1963 
NUR was composed of three academic units: the Faculty of Medicine, the Faculty of Social Sciences and the Teacher Training College (ENS). At that time, it had 51 students and 16 lecturers. By 2005, the university had 8221 students and 425 lecturers.
Important dates and facts are:
November 3, 1963: Official opening of NUR
May 12, 1964: Law establishing the NUR
1966: The National Institute of Education was created thanks to the UNDP and UNESCO: The Institute aimed at training and improving elementary secondary school teachers’ skills. It also aimed at implementing multidisciplinary pedagogical research.
1967: Creation of the University Extension as a unit with the mission to reflect NUR by its services to the people
1972: Creation of a research centre on pharmacopoeia and traditional medicine (CUPHARMETRA) in the Faculty of medicine. This became an autonomous body in 1980.
May 1973: NUR, in conjunction with the Ghent Faculty of Applied Sciences put up a progressive training program for civil engineers specialized in building and set up a fore-project program in electro mechanic engineering.
October 1973: The University of Instelling Antwerpen contributed in the opening of the Faculty of Law.
1974: A centre for study and experimentation of energy in Rwanda was created within the Faculty of Sciences. It became autonomous since 1977.
June 13, 1979: The Faculty of Agronomy, which was a department in the Faculty of Science, was created.
October 1, 1981: NUR and the NIE (National Institute of Education) were merged. Since then, the National University of Rwanda had two campuses: one at Ruhengeri and another at Butare. A few years later, the Faculty of Law shifted to Mburabuturo (Kigali).
November 1988: Celebration of the 25th anniversary of NUR. Official opening of the Institute of Public Administration (ISAP), born of NUR and Konrad Adanauer Foundation (FKA) cooperation
April–July 1994: The University community lost a good number of its staff and students who were killed during the war and genocide. They were victims of their ideology or ethnic identity. The University suffered a great loss: laboratory equipment, the computer equipment and academic infrastructure were destroyed or taken away. NUR was closed because of the prevailing war in the country, those who were not killed had to hide themselves, and others fled in exile.
January 1995: The campus of Ruhengeri and the Kigali Faculty of Law shifted and become part of the campus of Butare.
April 1995: Reopening of NUR. The main change was that all the faculties and schools were regrouped in Butare Campus for security reasons first and then for administrative reasons. The beginning was not easy but the government decided upon the smooth running of NUR at all costs. A Campus that was built for 1,600 students now had to lodge more than 4,500. NUR took off slowly but surely despite the wounds of war. English became a new language of teaching.
April 2, 1996: Creation of the School of Information Sciences and Techniques (ESTI)
1997: A preliminary year of language learning (French and English) is established for all UNR beginners.
1998: Creation of a doctorate level at the Faculty of Medicine
June 15, 1998: Creation of the Research Commission
End of 1998: The merging of the Faculty of Sciences and that of Applied Sciences to form the Faculty of Sciences and Technology.
1999: Creation of the Centre for Conflict Management
November 27, 1999: The University League against Aids (LUCS) was created
December 1999: Creation of the University Centre for Arts. Its mission was to dynamise arts and culture, in order to bring its contribution to the strategies of reconciliation, peace and national unity. Moreover, it would promote the international extension of Rwandan culture.
April 2000: The School of Public Health was created
August 2000: The School of Information Sciences and Techniques (ESTI) became the School of Journalism and Communication. The programme changed to answer more efficiently to the needs of the country.
November 3, 2002: The NUR Alumni was created
October 10, 2005: The official re-launching of post-graduate studies in the Faculty of Medicine
November 18, 2005: “Radio Salus”, the NUR Radio was officially launched
2013: Merged into the newly created University of Rwanda.

Colleges

1998: creation of the department of Clinical Psychology as a response to trauma from the 1994 genocide against the Tutsi. The department was integrated in the Faculty of Education, and later on (2009) moved to the Faculty of Medicine.

Faculties
The university has 9 faculties, comprises:
 Faculty of Medicine
 Faculty of Agriculture
 Faculty of Arts, Media and Social Sciences
 Faculty of Applied Sciences
 Faculty of Law
 Faculty of Science
 Faculty of Economics and Management
 School of Public Health 
 School for Foundation Language Skills
 faculty of creative design

Notable alumni

Bernard Makuza, Rwandan politician, former President of the Senate in Rwanda
Edouard Ngirente, Rwandan politician, Prime Minister of Rwanda
Pasteur Bizimungu, Rwandan politician, President of Rwanda from 1994 to 2000
Cyprien Ntaryamira, Burundian politician, former President of Burundi, killed in the crash of President Habyarimana Juvenal in 1994
Domitien Ndayizeye, Burundian politician, President of Burundi, 2003–2005
Dr Pierre Habumuremyi, Rwandan politician, former Prime Minister of Rwanda
Dr Alexandre Lyambabaje, Rwandan politician, academician and sportsman, Vice-Chancellor of the University of Rwanda
Jean Damascène Ntawukuliryayo, Rwandan politician, former President of the Rwandan Senate
Louise Mushikiwabo, Rwandan politician, Secretary General of La Francophonie and former minister of foreign affairs in Rwanda
Vincent Biruta, Rwandan politician, current Minister of Foreign Affairs in Rwanda
Rose Mukantabana, Rwandan politician, first female Speaker of the Chamber of Deputies
Koulsy Lamko, Chadian-born playwright, poet and novelist
Alice Rwema, vice chairperson and company secretary of Rwanda Energy Group
Pauline Nyiramasuhuko, convicted for genocidal rape

References

External links

   of the National University of Rwanda

Buildings and structures in Butare
Southern Province, Rwanda
Educational institutions established in 1963
National universities
Universities in Rwanda
1963 establishments in Rwanda
Educational institutions disestablished in 2013
2013 disestablishments in Rwanda